This is a list of people who have won the Irish Poker Open, the oldest, longest-running and most prestigious poker tournament after the World Series of Poker.

Poker